This article lists the special schools in Trinidad and Tobago
Charis Works Christian Academy
The Academy for Special Needs
The Immortelle Centre
Princess Elizabeth Centre (for physically disabled people)
School for the Blind
School for the Deaf
Lady Hochoy Home (for the cognitively impaired]] 
Visionary Learning Centre (for children with mental and learning disabilities)
Palmeras Learning Centre  ( For children who experience learning difficulties in the primary and secondary schools)
Aspirare Learning Community ( NPO for children with mental and learning difficulties in the primary age category)

References

 
 
Trinidad and Tobago